Plaza Indonesia (originally Plaza Indonesia Shopping Center) is a shopping mall located at Jalan M.H. Thamrin, Central Jakarta, Indonesia. The mall is part of the Plaza Indonesia Complex, which is a mixed development complex often referred to as "PI". Plaza Indonesia opened in 1990.
It is located at the corner of one of the landmarks of Jakarta, The Selamat Datang (Welcome) Monument.

History
Plaza Indonesia opened its doors in March 1990 on a site of 38,050 m2 at the junction of Jalan M. H. Thamrin and Jalan Kebon Kacang Raya, in Central Jakarta.  
The shopping center was designed by Hellmuth Obata & Kassabaum, and has undergone several major renovations; in 1996, 2000 and 2008.  Renovations of the south facade and Lamoda Café in the atrium was completed in 2014. Again in 2009, Plaza Indonesia expanded with 42,325 m2 of gross floor area in 6 levels, with 24,672 m2 more space. The first three levels of the retail extension are connected to the existing shopping center. The 4th to 6th levels are dedicated to "modern lifestyle concepts", with various dining and entertainment facilities. The extension also provides 5 levels of underground parking. The retail extension has an entrance on Jalan M.H. Thamrin. Plaza Indonesia is also connected to The Plaza Indonesia Complex.

Plaza Indonesia Complex
Plaza Indonesia Complex is a mixed development of 3 towers, 
The Plaza Office Tower,
Keraton at The Plaza and Grand Hyatt Jakarta - hotels

Keraton at the Plaza is a hotel and residential suites tower, which is 225 meters tall and has 48 floors above the ground. Hotel at Keraton is a franchise of The Luxury Collection. The Plaza Office Tower is a 200 meters tall office building, which has 42 floors above the ground and 5 floors below the ground. Grand Hyatt Hotel building is 122 meters high and has 30 floors.

See also

 List of shopping malls in Indonesia
 List of tallest buildings in Jakarta

External links
.

References

Skyscraper office buildings in Indonesia
Buildings and structures in Jakarta
Shopping malls in Jakarta
Post-independence architecture of Indonesia
Central Jakarta
1990 establishments in Indonesia
Shopping malls established in 1990